Salgado is a Spanish and Portuguese surname and may refer to:

Etymology 
The surname Salgado, in Galician and Portuguese, is a nickname for a witty person, coming from salgado 'salty', figuratively 'witty', 'piquant' (from Late Latin salicatus, past participle of salicare 'to give salt to').

Politicians

Equatorial Guinea
Alejandro Arias Salgado, colonial governor (1877-1879)

Honduras
Juan Ramón Salgado (1961–2006), member of the Liberal Party

Brazil
Clóvis Salgado da Gama, governor of Minas Gerais
Plínio Salgado (1895–1975), founder of Brazilian Integralism

Mexico
Alvárez Salgado Roberto, member of the LVI Legislature
Salgado Brito Juan, member of the LVI Legislature
Salgado Delgado Fernando, member of the LVI Legislature
Zeferino Salgado

Peru
Luz Salgado

Portugal
Salgado Zenha, founding member of the Socialist Party

Spain
Fernando Arias-Salgado, television personality and diplomat
Gabriel Arias-Salgado (1904–1962)
Rafael Arias-Salgado, member of the People's Party
Elena Salgado (born 1949)

Sports personalities
Belarmino Salgado (born 1966), a Cuban judoka
Carolina Solberg Salgado (born 1987), a Brazilian beach volleyball player
Dilhara Salgado (born 1983), Sri Lankan Sinhala archer
Eloy Salgado, footballer for the Houston Force
Javier Alvarez Salgado, a Spanish athlete
Jorge Sánchez Salgado (born 1985), a Cuban volleyball player
José Luis Salgado (born 1966), a Mexican footballer
Mario Salgado (born 1981), a Chilean footballer
Michel Salgado (born 1975), a Spanish footballer
Rafael Salgado Torres, president of Deportivo de La Coruña (1952-1953)
Omar Salgado (born 1993), an American soccer player

Musicians
Luis Humberto Salgado Torres, an Ecuadorian musician
Curtis Salgado (born 1954), an American musician
Gugut Salgado, member of Moonpools & Caterpillars
Johnny Salgado, member of Proyecto Uno
Michael Salgado, a Tejano musician

Other
Aaron J. Salgado, film director of Jamaica Motel
Carlos Salgado (died 2007), Honduran radio journalist and comedian
Carolina Salgado, former partner of Jorge Nuno Pinto da Costa
José Salgado, founder of Lobos, Argentina
Lélia Wanick Salgado, photographer
Leonardo Salgado, Argentine paleontologist
Minoli Salgado, Malaysian-born British writer and academic
M. P. Salgado, 40th Surveyor General of Sri Lanka
Ricardo Salgado, Portuguese economist and banker
Ranji Salgado (1929–2009), Sri Lankan Sinhala economist and civil servant
Rendell Tamaca Salgado, Filipino Protestant pastor and heraldic artist, a follower of Jesus Christ.
Rob Salgado, Golden Knights chess champion: 1975, 1983
Sebastião Salgado (born 1944), Brazilian photographer
Silvia Salgado, Mexican model

Extended names
Diego Salgado Costa de Menezes (Diego Salgado da Costa Menezes), a Brazilian footballer
Estéfano (Fabio Alonso Salgado), a Colombian musician
Francisco Franco (Francisco Paulino Hermenegildo Teódulo Franco y Bahamonde, Salgado y Pardo de Andrade), Spanish head of state
Ramón Franco (Ramón Franco y Bahamonde, Salgado y Pardo de Andrade), a Spanish aviator and  political activist
José Lind (José Lind Salgado), a Puerto Rican baseball player
Maria do Carmo Roma Machado Cardoso Salgado (born 1914), a member of the Portuguese nobility; great-grandmother of Maria Roma
Ruth Zavaleta (Ruth Zavaleta Salgado), a Mexican politician

Fictional people
Ligia Salgado (Teresa Seiblitz) (born 1964), Brazilian version of Desperate Housewives

Esperanza
Isabel Illutre de Salgado (Charo Santos-Concio) (born 1955)
Juan Salgado (Dante Rivero)
Raphael Salgado (Marvin Agustin) (born 1979)
Regina Salgado (Angelika de la Cruz) (born 1981)
Rosella Salgado (Carmina Villaroel) (born 1975)
Socorro Salgado (Judy Ann Santos) (born 1978)

See also
Salgado (disambiguation)

Given names